() refers to several days of police brutality against Communist Party of Germany (KPD) supporters in early May 1929 that led to violence between the communist demonstrators and members of the Berlin Police which was under the control of the Social Democratic Party of Germany (SPD). In defiance of a ban on public gatherings in Berlin, the KPD organized a rally to celebrate May Day. Although fewer supporters showed than the KPD had hoped for, the response by the Berlin Police was immediate and harsh, with police using firearms against mostly unarmed civilians. During the three days of the police attacks, 33 civilians were killed, 200 injured and over a thousand taken into police custody, many of whom were not involved in the initial KPD rally. The event was a significant moment in the decline of the Weimar Republic and its political stability. The incident also marked a turning point in relations between the center-left SPD government and the far-left Moscow-aligned KPD, weakening any prospect of a united left-wing opposition to fascism and the rising Nazi Party. The severity of the police response also led to a further erosion of public trust in the government.

Background
This victory was due to its leading position in the Weimar Coalition and the politically liberal, economically prosperous Golden Twenties. But its coalition agreements with centrist and even right-wing parties limited the extent to which it could pursue meaningful reforms addressed at labour relations and workers' rights. The KPD, meanwhile, remained one of the largest and most politically potent Communist parties in Europe, and gained 9 seats in the 1928 election (from 45 to 54). At the time, the Comintern position was that social democracy was really just "social fascism" that frustrated rather than helped the proletariat. Accordingly, the KPD under  pursued a hostile, confrontational position toward the SPD as defenders of the capitalist status quo. This perception was reinforced by the explicit anti-Communist views of numerous SPD politicians in the German and Prussian governments, including Chancellor , Interior Minister , Prussian Prime Minister , Prussian Interior Minister Albert Grzesinski, and Berlin police chief .

Despite its ideals of democracy and liberalism, the Weimar Republic had inherited, from its authoritarian predecessor, heavily militaristic state institutions accustomed to using repressive methods. The Berlin Police used military-style training methods, and was criticized both for its reactionary culture and for acquiring army weapons and equipment. The police were regularly involved in political violence throughout the 1920s, including against Communist dissidents. This led to a willingness among the Berlin Police to use a "a military advantage to inflict a decisive defeat on the 'proletarian enemy.

 

Like the Nazi  (SA), the RFB operated in small mobile fighting squads, trained (to various degrees) in street fighting. In late 1928 four people had died in fights between paramilitary groups. In December 1928,  issued a ban on open-air political gatherings in Berlin, citing a recent stabbing involving RFB members. The ban appeared to affirm the official Communist party line that capitalism had entered its Third Period and therefore the state would become more draconian in obstructing efforts to organize the proletariat.

In the lead-up to the 1929 celebration of International Workers' Day on the first of May, KPD-affiliated newspapers urged members and sympathizers to take to the streets. The KPD urged workers to defy the ban and organize peacefully, but to be prepared to strike on May 2 "if  dares to spill workers' blood." The newspaper  stressed "the sharpened movement of the power organs of the capitalist State against the proletariat" in describing potential police violence against Communists. The SPD newspaper  reported SPD politician 's belief that the KPD was seeking to intentionally sacrifice supporters' lives, saying the party would have to "reckon with" 200 dead. SPD support for the ban, however, was not unanimous, given the irony of a social democratic government preventing public gatherings on an international holiday for working people. Meanwhile, the Nazi newspaper  declared in April 1929 that the SPD and KPD fighting among themselves represented a "favourable wind" for the Nazi Party.

Events of May 1–3

On May 1 the KPD failed to organize a showing greater than normal, the majority of demonstrators coming from Communist strongholds in northern and eastern Berlin. Most businesses operated normally. SPD-affiliated trade unions held their own peaceful, well-attended meetings in closed assemblies. The Berlin Police, however, still responded in force to the open-air gatherings, with flying squads arriving in trucks and attacking any civilians with truncheons where any demonstration was reported. When the lawful indoor conventions dispersed and people took to the streets for home, the police arrested people merely because they were on the incorrect side of a police checkpoint or were caught up in fleeing a police sortie. Law enforcement handled the defiance of the ban as if it were the popular revolt the Communist press had called for, rather than the confused and haphazard act of civic disobedience that it truly was.

The police soon cleared the streets in central Berlin. In the  district, home to many Communist supporters, police violence gradually escalated into persistent street combat, including civilians erecting barricades. The police resorted to firearms, and one of the first victims killed was a man who was watching from his window. The police would later be criticized for not warning about shooting on sight. Two other victims were shot through doors, including an 80-year-old man in his apartment.

On May 2 Severing met with Grzesinski and Prussian Prime Minister . They immediately banned the primary German Communist newspaper  ('The Red Flag'), as a consequence of its incitement but also to hinder news spreading of the high civilian casualties. The KPD had called for a general strike on May 2 in response to the police violence, but as with the May Day turnout, this met with limited success. The KPD claimed that 25,000 people went on strike in Berlin on May 2, 3, and 4, and that an additional 50,000 walked out in sympathy elsewhere in Germany.

The RFB, previously operating underground in fear of outright proscription, joined the clashes in  during the afternoon of May 2, once more constructing barricades in largely spontaneous defensive actions. The Communist militants and the police exchanged gunfire in the streets. Contemporary police and media accounts depict a balanced urban battle between both sides, although modern scholars dispute this. For example, the Berlin Police attacked  Street from both ends, giving the perception of gunfire coming from both sides of the barricades. The police also enforced a general curfew, leading to confused confrontations in the darkness. Finally, the Communists were not as armed or prepared as the police, some having looted a hardware store for starting pistols that sounded like firearms but fired no bullets.

Aftermath

It was determined that over thirty people were killed, all civilians, and all by police firearms save for one individual struck by a speeding police van. Around 200 were injured and approximately 1,200 were arrested, with 44 later convicted and imprisoned (five were RFB members). Eight of the civilians killed were women and 19 were  residents. Of the first 25 victims, two were SPD members and 17 belonged to no party; none were KPD members. Most police reports stated the identity of the killer was unknown. Police found no evidence that the demonstrators who took to the streets were prepared for armed insurrection, with the house-to-house search in  producing mostly souvenirs from World War I.

A little over a month after the police attacks the KPD held its Twelfth Party Congress in Berlin. It passed a resolution calling the rioting "a turning-point in political developments in Germany... The preconditions are appearing for the approach of an immediately revolutionary situation, with the development of which the armed uprising must inevitably step onto the agenda." The KPD deepened their commitment to opposing the SPD as a fascist institution who would use instruments of the state against them. Yet there was no recognition that the KPD lacked the national (or even local in Berlin) influence needed to launch an actual rebellion of credible danger to the status quo. 

The SPD had their equivalent of the "social fascism" perspective in its leaders' anxieties over a new Spartacist uprising. Although the KPD did desire to overthrow the Weimar Republic, extremist parties did not have the same appeal they would enjoy after the Great Depression of 1929 hit Germany. The SPD government considered the KPD more of a threat than the Nazi Party, as evidenced by Grezesinski lifting the ban on Adolf Hitler speaking publicly in September 1928. "Hysterical assessments" by SPD politicians of the threat posed by the KPD combined with the militant nature of the Berlin police meant that conflict and even violence between the two groups was probable if not inevitable.

See also 
 Altona Bloody Sunday

References 

1929 in Europe
1929 in Germany
Politics of the Weimar Republic
Political violence
Protests in Germany
Communist Party of Germany
Anti-communism in Germany
Riots and civil disorder in Germany
Police misconduct in Germany